Mehdi Mohammadi (10 October 1952 – 7 September 2013) was an Iranian football coach who served as assistant manager at Mes Kerman for more than ten years. He managed Mes Kerman two times as the caretaker manager of the club, first from November to December 2009 after the sacking of Parviz Mazloomi and the second in 2013 after Ebrahim Ghasempour resigned as the manager of the club.

References

1952 births
2013 deaths
Iranian football managers
Sanat Mes Kerman F.C. managers
Iranian footballers
Association football defenders